El Rosal may refer to:

El Rosal, Caracas a neighbourhood in Caracas, Venezuela
El Rosal, Chile, a village in Penco, Chile, part of the Greater Concepción conurbation
El Rosal, Cundinamarca a town and municipality in Cundinamarca, Colombia
O Rosal (in Galician; El Rosal in Spanish), a municipality in the province of Pontevedra, Galicia, Spain
Rosal de la Frontera a municipality in the province of Huelva, Andalusia, Spain
El Rosal de los Boldos (known as "El Rosal"), a neighbourhood in the Chilean commune of Santa Cruz, Colchagua Province

See also
Rosa (disambiguation)
 Rosal, a surname